The Solon Community School District is a rural public school district based in Solon, Iowa.  The district is mainly in Johnson County, with a small area in Linn County, and serves the town of Solon and surrounding areas, including the area around Lake MacBride.

Dr. Davis Eidahl was hired as the superintendent in 2015.

The school's mascot is the Spartans. Their colors are orange and black.

Schools
The district operates four schools, all in Solon:
Lakeview Elementary School
Solon Intermediate School
Solon Middle School
Solon High School

Solon High School

Athletics
The Spartans compete in the WaMaC Conference in the following sports:

Baseball (boys)
2-time State Champions - 2010, 2011
Basketball (boys and girls)
 2009 Boys' Class 2A Basketball State Champions
 Girls' 3-time Class 2A State Champions - 1994, 1997, 1998
Bowling
Cross Country (boys and girls)
Football
5-time State Champions - 1988, 2007, 2008, 2009, 2010
Golf (boys and girls)
 1995 Girls' Class 1A State Champions
Soccer (boys and girls)
Softball (girls)
 3-time State Champions - 2003, 2007, 2015
Swimming (boys and girls)
Tennis (boys and girls)
Track and Field (boys and girls)
 Boys' 2-time Class 3A State Champions - 2010, 2014
Volleyball (girls)
 2014 Class 3A State Champions
Wrestling

See also
List of school districts in Iowa
List of high schools in Iowa

References

External links
 Solon Community School District

Education in Johnson County, Iowa
Education in Linn County, Iowa
School districts in Iowa